Passiflora hirtiflora is a species of plant in the family Passifloraceae. It is endemic to Ecuador.

References

Flora of Ecuador
hirtiflora
Vulnerable plants
Taxonomy articles created by Polbot